Corvula is a genus of fish in the family Sciaenidae.

Species
There are currently 3 recognized species in the genus Corvula:
 Corvula batabana Poey, 1860 - blue croaker
 Corvula macrops Steindachner, 1876 -vacuocua croaker
 Corvula sanctaeluciae Jordan, 1890 - striped croaker

References

Sciaenidae